The 2019 VLN Series was the 42nd season of the VLN and the last one with the VLN name.

Calendar

Entry Lists
Entries are split into multiple different classes:
SP9 – For FIA-homologated GT3 cars.
SPX – 'Special vehicles' which do not fit into any other class.
SP7 – Purpose-built racecars with an engine capacity between 3500 and 3999cc.
Cup 2 – Porsche Carrera Cup cars.
SP8 – Purpose-built racecars with an engine capacity over 4000cc.
SP8T – Purpose-built racecars with an engine capacity over 4000cc and a turbocharger.
SP10 – For FIA- and SRO-homologated GT4 cars.
SP6 – Purpose-built racecars with an engine capacity between 3000 and 3499cc.
SP4 – Purpose-built racecars with an engine capacity between 2000 and 2499cc.
SP4T – Purpose-built racecars with an engine capacity between 2000 and 2499cc and a turbocharger.
SP3 – Purpose-built racecars with an engine capacity between 1750 and 2999cc.
SP3T – Purpose-built racecars with an engine capacity between 1750 and 2999cc and a turbocharger.
SP-Pro – Prototype racecars with an engine capacity over 3000cc.
SP2T – Purpose-built racecars with an engine capacity between 1400 and 1749cc and a turbocharger.
V6 – Production cars with an engine capacity over 3500cc.
V5 – Production cars with an engine capacity between 2500cc and 2999cc.
VT3 – Production cars with an engine capacity over 3000cc and a turbocharger.
VT2 – Production cars with an engine capacity between 2000 and 2999cc and a turbocharger.
H2 – Pre-2008 production cars and purpose-built racecars with an engine capacity between 2000 and 6249cc.
AT(-G) – Vehicles using alternative fuel sources (e.g. electric, LPG, hydrogen, etc.)
Cup 5 – BMW M235i Racing Cup
V4 – Production cars with an engine capacity between 2000 and 2499cc.
TCR – FIA-homologated TCR Touring Cars.
Cup X – KTM X-Bow Cup.
Cup 3 – Porsche Cayman GT4 Trophy.

SP9

SPX

SP7

Cup 2

SP8

SP8T

SP10

SP6

SP4

SP4T

H2

V4

TCR

Other classes

Race Results
Results indicates overall winner only in the whole race.

Notes

References

External links 
 
 

2019 in German motorsport
Nürburgring Endurance Series seasons